Hero (Chinese: 大英雄) is a Singaporean blockbuster drama produced and telecast on Mediacorp Channel 8. The show aired at 9pm on weekdays and had a repeat telecast at 8am the following day. It stars Shaun Chen , Chen Hanwei & Jesseca Liu as the casts of this series. This Drama entailed a lot of cameo appearances by famous Singaporean artists such as Zoe Tay, Rebecca Lim, Xiang Yun, Jack Neo, Carrie Wong and more.

Plot

Through the lives of Zhou Fada (Shaun Chen), Ye Xiaoying (Chen Hanwei) and Zhang Weixiong (Jesseca Liu), three ordinary characters who grew up in Dakota Crescent, a series of interesting, exciting and personal stories will unfold…

Zhou Fada, also known as Big Brother, is a man with a strong sense of justice, loyalty and compassion. He always like to help neighbor handle the problem in need. But because of his overzealous and reckless character, his good intentions often turn out to cause more trouble than help.

Ye Xiaoying is Fada's uncle, who always dreams of achieving phenomenal success in life, but he never did live up to his dreams as he is essentially just a slacker. He is very good at keeping out of trouble, by tactically avoiding tricky situations. His motto in life is: A man's greatest power is not his fists, but his tongue. He believes that being good with words can help one sail through career and relationships smoothly, but the fact is, his career and love affairs are almost always on the rocks.

Zhang Weixiong is a manly name, but the owner of the name is actually a cute girl. When her mother was pregnant with her, the ultrasound scan showed that it was a baby boy, so her father went to the fortune teller and got her this dashing manly name. Who would have expected that it was a baby girl! But they went along with the name “Wei Xiong” after all. Weixiong is just like her name; she has great ambitions and a gusty character, and people in the neighborhood see her as the future elite. Unfortunately, that is just her pretense. She is actually very timid and cowardly, but she believes that in order to survive in this dog-eat-dog world, you will have to “never say die”. So even though she is crumbling from fear inside, she would always put up a strong front, and her strong-headedness always gets her into trouble. If not for the help of Big Brother Fada, with this personality, she might have much consequences to suffer.

This three characters, together known as “The Great Hero”, are the three musketeers of the neighborhood, and from them, we will get to know many other members of Dakota Crescent, and also their inspiring, interesting and heart-warming stories.

Cast

Zhou family

Zhang (Zhiming) family

Ou (Sihai) family
{| class="wikitable"
|-
!style="background:#f2dfc6; | Cast 
!style="background:#f2dfc6; | Role 
!style="background:#f2dfc6; | Description 
|-
| Zhu Houren || Ou Sihai  区四海 ||Uncle Hai (海叔)
Ou Jinguang and Ou Jinxuan's father
Xiuzhen and Ye Xiaoying's father-in-law
|-
| Andie Chen  陈邦鋆 || Ou Jinguang  区金光 ||Guang (阿光/光哥) 
Ou Sihai's son
Ou Jinxuan's elder brother
Xiuzhen's husband
Ye Xiaoying's brother-in-law
Zhou Fada's best friend
In love with Fan Fangfang
|-
| Youyi  有懿 || Xiuzhen  秀珍 || 
Ms Buck Teeth (龅牙姐)
Ou Jinguang's wife
Fan Fangfang's rival in love
Ou Sihai's daughter-in-law
Ou Jinxuan and Ye Xiaoying's sister-in-law
Auntie Teochew's daughter 
|-
| Paige Chua  蔡琦慧 || Ou Jinxuan  区金萱 ||
Villain (later part) but repented in the endYoume/Ms Diana (Diana 小姐)
Ou Sihai's daughter
Ou Jinguang's younger sister
Xiuzhen's sister-in-law
Ye Xiaoying's fiancée 
Boyboy's mother 
|-
|Nicholas Lim 林道锐 || Boy Boy ||
'Little Imp (小冬瓜)
Ye Xiaoying and Ou Jinxuan's son
|}

Guan (A-li) family

Luo (Bei) family

Other characters

Cameo appearances

Original Sound Track (OST) 

Production

Dakota Crescent is one of Singapore's earliest housing estates, built in 1958 by the Singapore Improvement Trust (SIT), which preceded the Housing and Development Board (HDB). In July 2014, it was decided that the housing estate would be redeveloped under the HDB's SERS scheme and all residents would have to relocate by 2016. This prompted a campaign by activists for its conservation, work of art to be created about it and also media coverage given to Dakota Crescent.

This drama series was produced also as a means of kick-starting the commemoration of 35 years of Singapore-produced Chinese-language television in Singapore. As part of this, Mediacorp's famous Chinese-speaking comedy icons, such as Paris and Milan character Auntie Lucy (played by Dennis Chew) and Liang Po Po (played by Jack Neo) of Comedy Nite, will be making cameo appearances in this drama.

Imaging sessions were done in end-April and early-May 2016, while the first scene was shot on 23 May. On 30 July 2016, in the nineteenth season of The Sheng Siong Show'', it was also announced that Power Station will be performing the drama's ending theme. They were in Singapore to promote their "Next Station" world tour which will be held on 27 August.

A post screening session was conducted at Dakota Crescent's Care and Friends Centre. The cast of Hero - Shaun Chen, Jesseca Liu, Chen Hanwei, Bonnie Loo, Paige Chua, Ian Fang, Sheila Sim, Youyi, He Yingying, Aileen Tan, Brandon Wong and Jin Yinji were present. The first episode of the show was also broadcast there.

Accolades
The series has the most nominations in Star Awards 2017, and won two, which was Best Supporting Actress and Drama Serial.

See also
 List of MediaCorp Channel 8 Chinese drama series (2010s)

References

Singapore Chinese dramas
2016 Singaporean television series debuts
2017 Singaporean television series endings
Channel 8 (Singapore) original programming